Grand Forks Airport  is located  south southeast of Grand Forks, British Columbia, Canada.

References

External links

Registered aerodromes in British Columbia
Boundary Country